Shinzo (foaled 26 August 2020) is a Group 1 winning Australian Thoroughbred racehorse who is most notable for winning the 2023 Golden Slipper.

Background

Shinzo was foaled and raised at Coolmore and is by dual Group 1 winning mare Samaready. Samaready was bought by Coolmore in 2020 for $1.8million at the Magic Millions National Broodmare Sale when she was carrying Shinzo in utero.

Racing career

Shinzo made his race debut on 25 January 2023 in the Canonbury Stakes when finishing in third position.

After finishing second at his next start in the Skyline Stakes, Shinzo then won the Pago Pago Stakes with jockey James McDonald on board.  This victory assured the horse a start in the Golden Slipper just seven days later.

On 18 March 2023, Shinzo started at odds of $16/1 in the Golden Slipper at Rosehill.  Ridden by Ryan Moore, Shinzo settled midfield in the run before getting a rails run to win by 1¼ lengths.   The victory was trainer Chris Waller's first win in the race.  It also gave Waller the final leg of Australian racing's “Grand-Slam” having won the big 4 races; the Melbourne Cup, the Caulfield Cup, Cox Plate and the Golden Slipper.

Pedigree

References

Racehorses bred in Australia
Racehorses trained in Australia
2020 racehorse births